The Disappearance of Adalia is the first release from Madina Lake self-released on October 3, 2006. It garnered the attention of Roadrunner Records which ultimately led to their signing to the label. Songs "One Last Kiss", "Here I Stand" and "Adalia" were re-recorded for their debut album "From Them, Through Us, to You" released in 2007. The song "Pecadillos" is also Madina Lake's first released instrumental song.

Track listing

1. House of Cards = 3:38

2. One Last Kiss = 3:43

3. Here I Stand = 3:17

4. Adalia = 2:29

5. Escape from Here = 3:33

6. Pecadillos = 0:49

References

Madina Lake albums
2006 debut EPs